Håvard Flo (born 4 April 1970) is a Norwegian former professional footballer who played as a forward. He played for Stryn TIL and Sogndal Fotball, before he left Norway in 1994 and played for AGF, SV Werder Bremen, and Wolverhampton Wanderers F.C. He returned to Sogndal in 2001. He made a comeback for Sogndal in 2010.

Career
Flo was born in Flo, Stryn. His most successful spell was in AGF, where he won the Danish Cup in 1996. The same year AGF finished second in the League – behind eventual champions Brøndby. AGF also won a bronze medal in the "Flo-era". Flo is still remembered in Aarhus as one of the best AGF players ever. In 2008, when Flo first announced his retirement, he returned to Aarhus for a final tribute in the half time break.

He was a member of the Norwegian squad at the 1998 FIFA World Cup in which he also scored in the tie against Scotland, and is a cousin of fellow footballers Jostein Flo, Tore André Flo and Jarle Flo. Håvard Flo's nephew Per Egil Flo also plays for Sogndal. His last match was in the second leg play-off against Aalesunds FK. Sogndal lost 7–2 on aggregate, but he scored the only Sogndal goal away and got applause even from the Aalesund fans.

Flo was a large and physically strong player, who was also renowned for having a good touch, in spite of his size.

Honours
AGF Aarhus
 Danish Cup: 1995–96

Werder Bremen
 UEFA Intertoto Cup: 1998

References

External links
 Håvard Flo in Store norske leksikon 

Living people
1970 births
Association football forwards
Norwegian expatriate footballers
Expatriate men's footballers in Denmark
Expatriate footballers in England
Expatriate footballers in Germany
Norwegian footballers
Norway international footballers
1998 FIFA World Cup players
Aarhus Gymnastikforening players
Wolverhampton Wanderers F.C. players
SV Werder Bremen players
Sogndal Fotball players
Bundesliga players
Danish Superliga players
Eliteserien players
People from Stryn
Flo family
Sportspeople from Vestland